Bruce Ditmas Bromley (March 20, 1893 – January 29, 1980) was an American lawyer and politician.

Life
He was the son of Peter Brewster Bromley (1861–1926) and Sarah Suydam (Ditmas) Bromley (1857–1936). He graduated from the University of Michigan in 1914, and then entered Harvard Law School, but left to serve in the U. S. Navy during World War I. He left the Navy in 1919 as a lieutenant. He received his law degree from Harvard after the war, was admitted to the bar in 1920, and commenced practice in New York City as assistant to Henry L. Stimson. He later joined the law firm that is now known as Cravath, Swaine & Moore, and stayed with it for more than 50 years. While at Cravath, he won big cases for IBM, Westinghouse Electric, Bethlehem Steel, General Motors, Esquire magazine, and other corporate giants.

On January 14, 1949, he was appointed by Governor Thomas E. Dewey to the New York Court of Appeals, to fill the vacancy caused by the resignation of Thomas D. Thacher. In November 1949, he was defeated by Democrat Charles W. Froessel when running for a full term.

In 1969, he appeared for the U.S. House of Representatives in the U.S. Supreme Court case of Powell v. McCormack, in which Congressman Adam Clayton Powell Jr. questioned his exclusion from the House.

Bromley died at the New York Hospital—Cornell Medical Center.

A law chair at Harvard Law School is named after him. Among Bruce Bromley Professors of Law were Arthur R. Miller and Paul M. Bator. The current holder is William Rubenstein.

See also
Thomas D. Barr, a Cravath lawyer who ran the IBM case for 13 years

References
The History of the New York Court of Appeals, 1932-2003 by Bernard S. Meyer, Burton C. Agata & Seth H. Agata (page 23)
Court of Appeals judges at New York Courts History
"Bromley Selected for Appeals Bench". The New York Times. January 15, 1949. (subscription required)
"The Law; At The Bar". The New York Times. May 20, 1988.
"Those #X!!! Lawyers". Time. April 10, 1978.
Picture of Bruce Bromley in The Washington Post on March 21, 2005
Powell At The Supreme Court
 John F. Manning, "Bruce Bromley Professor of Law," at Harvard University
"Bruce Bromley, 87, Former Judge on Appeals Court". The New York Times. January 30, 1980. (subscription required)

Further reading

1893 births
1980 deaths
Harvard Law School alumni
Judges of the New York Court of Appeals
United States Navy officers
Politicians from Pontiac, Michigan
United States Navy personnel of World War I
20th-century American judges
Cravath, Swaine & Moore people
University of Michigan alumni
Military personnel from Michigan